Forensic psychology is the practice of psychology applied to the law. Forensic psychology is the application of scientific knowledge and methods to help answer legal questions arising in criminal, civil, contractual, or other judicial proceedings. Forensic psychology includes research on various psychology-law topics, such as jury selection, reducing systemic racism in criminal law, eyewitness testimony, evaluating competency to stand trial, or assessing military veterans for service-connected disability compensation. The field traces its roots to contributions by Wilhem Wundt, Hugo Münsterberg, and Sigmund Freud among others. Contemporary definitions of forensic psychology recognize that several subfields of psychology apply "the scientific, technical, or specialized knowledge of psychology to the law." The American Psychological Association's Specialty Guidelines for Forensic Psychologists reference several psychology subdisciplines, such as social, clinical, experimental, counseling, and neuropsychology.

History

Early development of forensic psychology 

Wilhelm Wundt is commonly known for being the first to begin experimentation in the field of psychology and, thus, igniting the flame for future individuals to apply these experimental processes to various contexts, including legal ones. A student of Wundt and the first director of Harvard's psychological laboratory, Hugo Münsterberg, authored On the Witness Stand in the first decade of the 20th century. Münsterberg used this publication to bridge the gap between psychological and legal principles through the introduction of psychological research that could be applied in legal proceedings. Sigmund Freud discussed how psychopathological processes play a role in criminal behavior. Lightner Witmer, William Stern, and William Healy also contributed to the early development of forensic psychology.

Key legal cases

Brown v. Board of Education 

Brown v. Board of Education of Topeka, 1954, was the first case where the Supreme Court of the United States referenced expert opinions by psychologists. After this, the addition of psychological mechanisms within courtrooms began to be considered beneficial.

Jenkins v. United States (1962) 

Several years after the ruling of Brown v. Board of Education of Topeka, Justice David Bazelon of the D.C. Circuit Court of Appeals ruled that psychologists had the legal authority to testify as medical experts about mental illness.

Establishment in psychological societies 

The American Psychology–Law Society (AP-LS) was created in 1969 and later converted into Division 41 of the APA in 1980. As the field continued to grow, more organizations supported the study of psychology with application to the law. In 1976 the American Board of Forensic Psychology (ABFP) was chartered and eventually became a part of the American Board of Professional Psychology (ABPP) in 1985. Later, organizations and conferences aided in solidifying the development of forensic psychology, such as the American Academy of Forensic Psychology and the National Invitational Conference on Education and Training in Forensic Psychology (1995). By 2001, the field of Forensic Psychology was recognized as a professional specialty by The American Psychological Association (APA).

Forensic psychology in popular culture 
Recently, forensic psychology has grown in popularity in the media and among younger generations. For example, many recent docuseries on Netflix feature forensic psychological content, including Making a Murderer and Sins of our Mother. Other TV shows and movies such as Criminal Minds, Manhunter, Mindhunter, and Silence of The Lambs have widely popularized the practice of criminal profiling, particularly within the Federal Bureau of Investigation's (FBI) Behavioral Analysis Unit (BAU).

Legal Cases

Ted Bundy 
One example of a well-known case that used forensic psychology was Ted Bundy's sentencing. Ted Bundy was a serial killer and rapist in the 1970s who after being arrested three times, confessed to killing 36 women. In 1980, he went to trial and was evaluated by multiple psychology professionals to determine his ability to stand before the court. 

After his first arrest, Dr. Al C. Carlisle evaluated Bundy and reported finding two distinct personas. Carlisle found he could be normal and friendly, but evil at the same time. Carlisle diagnosed Bundy with a dependent personality disorder. A dependent personality disorder is defined as individuals doubting their abilities and having an intense need to be taken care of.

Another evaluation from the prosecution's expert, psychiatrist Dr. Hervey Cleckley, found that Bundy was a psychopath. A psychopath is an individual who is detached, selfish, and possesses a lack of empathy.  Cleckley stated that Bundy was a psychopath but was able to handle himself enough to stand trial. The diagnosis of a psychopath was supported by Dorothy Ottnow Lewis, a psychiatrist from New York.

The results from the multiple psychologist evaluations determined that Ted Bundy was fit to stand before the court.

Training and education 
Forensic psychology involves both elements of basic as well as applied work. Forensic psychologists may hold a Ph.D. or Psy.D. in clinical psychology, counseling psychology, social psychology, organizational psychology, school psychology, or experimental psychology under accredited institutions. Additionally, 2 years of supervised experience in their field is necessary. There are no specific license requirements in the United States to be a forensic psychologist, although U.S. states, territories, and the District of Columbia require licensure for psychologists in the state they intend to practice. Certification specifically in forensic psychology is also available.

In other countries, training and practitioner requirements may vary. In the United Kingdom, for example, a person must obtain the Graduate Basis for Registration with the British Psychological Society – normally through an undergraduate degree. This would be followed by Stages 1 (academic) and 2 (supervised practice) of the Diploma in Forensic Psychology (which would normally take 3 years full-time and 4 years part-time). Assessment occurs via examination, research, supervised practice, and the submission of a portfolio showing expertise across a range of criminological and legal applications of psychology. Once qualified as a "chartered" psychologist (with a specialism in forensic psychology), a practitioner must engage in continued professional development and demonstrate how much and of what kind, each year, in order to renew their practicing certificate.

There are 65 forensic psychology degree programs offered in the US. Average tuition cost is $9,475 in-state and $25,856 out-of-state.

Roles in forensic psychology

Practice/direct service 
Evaluations and assessments are completed by forensic psychologists to assess a person's psychological state for legal purposes. Reasons for completing these evaluations can involve acquiring information for criminal court (such as insanity or incompetence), for criminal sentencing or parole hearings (often regarding a potential intellectual disability that prevents sentencing or one's risk of recidivism), for family court (including child custody or parental termination cases), or civil court (involving, for example, personal injury, competence to manage one's financial affairs, and psychological autopsies especially as related to testamentary capacity). Additional assessments that these professionals can perform include school threats. There is great debate about whether these Forensic Psychological evaluations constitute as health care treatment, with the majority of arguments claiming they do not. It is important to note that while a forensic psychologist is responsible for assessing and reporting results of an evaluation, they do not make decisions on "ultimate issues" such as competence to stand trial or service-connected disability for U.S. military veterans. Instead, the information provided by the expert evaluator is analyzed and is ruled on by the court which ordered the evaluation to take place.

Treatment 
Forensic psychologists may be asked to administer psychological interventions to those who require or request services in both criminal and civil cases. In regard to criminal cases, forensic psychologists can work with individuals who have already been sentenced to reduce the likelihood of repeating his or her offense. In these cases, other treatments are frequently put together, especially for substance use disorder, sex offenders, mental illness, or anger management. As for civil proceedings, forensic psychology treats families going through divorce cases, custody cases, and psychological injuries as a result of some kind of trauma. Treatment often occurs in forensic and state psychiatric hospitals, mental health centers, and private practices.

Consultations 
Providing consultations allows forensic psychologists to apply psychological expertise and research to help law enforcement, attorneys, and other legal professionals or proceedings better understand human behavior (e.g. criminal, witness, victim, jury), civil processes, effects of trauma or other life events, and so on. If working as a consultant, a forensic psychologist is able to be involved in legal proceedings through responsibilities such as reviewing court records (such as a defendant's psychosocial history or assess mitigating or aggravating factors in a case), serving as a jury consultant (organizing focus groups, shadow juries, mock juries, or helping with the voir dire proceedings), and assessment without testimony (in which results of a defendant's evaluation are not disclosed to the prosecution team, allowing the defense team to develop a defense strategy), among others. Essentially, consultations can take a number of forms, including the common ones below:

 Law enforcement consultations may take the form of assisting with criminal profiling, developing hiring procedures and methods, determining the psychological fitness of returning officers, or simply lending expertise on certain criminal behaviors. There are several methods and approaches related to criminal profiling, but there is a lot of skepticism and criticism about the efficiency and accuracy of criminal profiling in general. A couple common approaches are the scientific approach, which includes the FBI's Crime Scene Analysis and Canter's Investigative Psychology, and the intuitive approach, which includes Tukey's Behavioral Evidence Analysis.
 Trial consultants are psychologists who work with legal professionals, such as attorneys, to aid in case preparation. This includes jury selection, development of case strategy, and witness preparation. Forensic psychologists working as trial consultants rely on research in order to best advise the individuals they are working with. Because trial consultants are often hired by one specific side in a trial, these psychologists are faced with many ethical issues. It is the responsibility of the psychologist to remain neutral when consulting – in other words, the consultant must not choose a side to support and consequentially omit or create information that would be beneficial to one side or another. Prior to accepting a case to work on, it is important that the forensic psychologist weigh the responsibilities of consulting on that case with the ethical guidelines put in place for the field of forensic psychology.

Expert testimony about matters relating to psychology is also an area in which forensic psychologists play an active role. Unlike fact witnesses, who are limited to testifying about what they know or have observed, expert witnesses have the ability to express further knowledge of a situation or topic because, as their name suggests, they are presumed to be "experts" in a certain topic and possess specialized knowledge about it. The requirements that must be met for forensic psychologists to be considered expert witnesses include clinical psychology expertise and knowledge of the laws that have jurisdiction over the court they are to testify. Procedural and legal rules guide expert testimony, which include that the evidence must be relevant to the case, the method the expert used must be valid and reliable, and that the evidence will help the trier of fact. An expert can be deposed by opposing counsel to discover what they plan to say in court, and attorneys have the opportunity to raise a challenge to the admissibility of the expert's testimony if there are questions about its relevance, or its validity and reliability (in the United States - the rules vary by country and jurisdiction). Regardless of who calls in the expert, it is the judge who determines whether or not the expert witness will be accepted through a voir dire process of qualification.

Research 
Forensic psychology researchers make scientific discoveries relevant to psychology and the law and they also sometimes provide expert witness testimony. These professionals usually have an advanced degree in psychology (most likely a PhD). These professionals may be employed in various settings, which include colleges and universities, research institutes, government or private agencies, and mental health agencies. Researchers test hypotheses empirically regarding issues related to psychology and the law, such as jury research and research on mental health law and policy evaluation. Their research may be published in forensic psychology journals such as Law and Human Behavior or Psychology, Public Policy, and Law, as well as more broadly in basic psychology journals. Some famous psychologists in the field include Scott Lilienfeld who was widely known for his scholarship on psychopathology and psychopathy, Saul Kassin who is widely known for studying false confessions, Jennifer Skeem who is widely known for studying justice-involved people with mental illness, Michael Saks who is known for his contributions to jury research and improvements to forensic science, Barbara Spellman who is known for her cognitive psychology-law work as well as for her open science leadership, and Elizabeth Loftus and Gary Wells who are both known for their research on eyewitness memory.

Education 
Academic forensic psychologists engage in teaching, researching, training, and supervision of students, among other education-related activities. These professionals also have an advanced degree in psychology (most likely a PhD) and are most often employed at colleges and universities. In addition to holding professorships, forensic psychologists may engage in education through presenting research, hosting talks relating to a particular subject, or engaging with and educating the community about a relevant forensic psychology topic.

Advocacy 
Through advocacy, forensic psychologists can use psychological research to influence laws and policies. These may be related to certain movements, such as Black Lives Matter or the Me Too movement, or may even be related to certain civil rights that are being overlooked.

Forensic psychological evaluations

Common types of evaluations

Forensic assessments of competencies 
Competence, in a legal setting, refers to the defendant's ability to appreciate and understand the charges against them and what is happening in the legal proceedings, as well as their ability to help the lawyer understand and defend their case. Though it is the psychologist's responsibility to assess for competence, it is ultimately up to the judge to decide whether the defendant is competent or not. If the defendant is found incompetent to stand trial, the psychologist must then give a recommendation on whether or not the defendant can be restored to competence through treatment or if the charges should be dropped completely due to incompetence. Potential causes of incompetence include brain damage, the occurrence of a psychotic episode, a mental disorder, or a developmental disability.

Multiple cases have helped define competence. In Dusky v. United States (1960), the case upheld the Youtsey v. United States ruling and set specific criteria for competence. These include having a rational and factual understanding of court proceedings and being able to consult with an attorney in a rational manner. The case of Weiter v. Settle (1961) resulted in the decision that a psychologist's opinion in a competency hearing is considered "opinion testimony." Additionally, guidelines were put in place to accurately evaluate competency. The eight guidelines established include requirements that the defendant appreciates one's own presence in relation to time, place, and things; understands that they are in a Court of Justice, charged with a criminal offense; recognizes that there is a Judge who presides over the Court; understands that there is a Prosecutor who will try to convict them of criminal charges; understands that they have a lawyer who will defend them against that charge; knows that they are expected to tell their attorney what they were doing at the time of the alleged offense; understands that a jury will determine whether they are guilty or innocent of the charges; and has sufficient memory to discuss issues related to the alleged offense and the court proceedings. As time has progressed, more cases have added to these guidelines and expectations when evaluating competency.

Forensic assessment of insanity 
Insanity, as opposed to competence, refers to an individual's mental state at the time of the crime rather than at the time of the trial. According to legal principles of insanity, it is only acceptable to judge, find someone criminally responsible, and punish a defendant if that individual was sane at the time of the crime. In order to be considered sane, the defendant must have exhibited both mens rea and actus reus. Mens rea, translated to "guilty mind", indicates that the individual exhibited free will and some intent to do harm at the time of the crime. Actus reus refers to the voluntary committing of an unlawful act. The insanity defense acknowledges that, while an unlawful act did occur, the individual displayed a lack of mens rea. The burden of proof in determining if a defendant is insane lies with the defense team. A notable case relating to this type of assessment is that of Ford v. Wainwright, in which it was decided that forensic psychologists must be appointed to assess the competency of an inmate to be executed in death penalty cases.

There are various definitions of insanity acknowledged within the legal system. The M'Naghten/McNaugton rule (1843) defines insanity as the individual not understanding the nature and quality of his or her acts or that these acts were wrong due to a mental disease or defect. This is also referred to as the cognitive capacity test. Meanwhile, the Durham Test (established in Durham v. United States, 1954) states that one can be declared insane if the actions were caused by a mental disorder. The vague nature of this description causes this definition to only be used in one state (New Hampshire). The final definition acknowledged within the courts is the Brawner Rule (U.S. v. Brawner, 1972), also referred to as the American Law Institute Standard. This definition posits that, due to a mental disease or defect, an individual is considered insane if unable to appreciate the wrongfulness of an act and are unable to conform their behavior to the dictates of the law.

Evaluating insanity involves using crime scene analysis to determine the mental state at the time of the crime, establishing a diagnosis, interviewing the defendant and any other relevant witnesses, and verifying impressions of the defendant. Challenges associated with this type of assessment involve defendant malingering, determining the defendant's past mental state, the chance that different experts may come to different conclusions depending on the assessment method used, and the fact that it is very common for society to label any psychological disorder as insane (though few actually fall into this category; insanity primarily involves psychotic disorders).

Violence risk assessment 
Violence risk assessment evaluates how dangerous an individual is, or could be, and the risk of them re-offending, also referred to as recidivism. Risk assessments affect the possibility of an inmate receiving parole or being released from prison and are also used in sentencing. Imposition of the death penalty often requires a consideration of "future dangerousness," for which risk assessment can play a vital role. Although there are many advocates for the use of risk assessment in sentencing, sometimes referred to as "evidence-based sentencing," as a method for reducing mass incarceration in the United States, there are others who question whether risk assessments are accurate enough to be relied upon when making these consequential legal decisions. Risk assessment, as with any attempt to understand future behavior, is very difficult, especially because "risk" isn't always defined the same way in different legal settings. There is a wide research literature on risk assessment, but the information is varied and sometimes contradictory, and bias can play a role in risk assessment. It is also difficult to assess the accuracy of risk assessment and for individual clinicians to receive feedback on their risk assessment decisions. Making a false negative decision in the real world (i.e., labeling someone who is actually high-risk as low-risk) tends to have more visible consequences than making a false positive decision (i.e., labeling someone who is actually low-risk as high-risk), and clinicians might never even find out that the latter assessment was incorrect. This risk imbalance in making these types of errors can bias clinicians away from making low-risk classifications. In experimental validation studies, risk assessment accuracy is typically measured using area under the ROC curve (AUC), a statistical method which indicates the likelihood that a random high-risk offender would be classified as higher risk than a random low-risk offender.

 Types of violence risk assessments.  There are several different methods of risk assessment, the main five of which are unstructured clinical assessment, anamnestic assessment, structured professional judgment, actuarial assessment, and adjusted actuarial assessment.
 Unstructured clinical assessment is a form of risk assessment in which the forensic examiner or clinician decides both what information to use and how to use it to determine risk, based on their clinical judgment. The information used in these types of assessments tends to come from in-depth interviews with the examinee, as well as collateral interviews with known personal contacts, the results of psychological testing, and historical records. Because these assessments rely heavily on the individual clinician's judgment, the interrater reliability for this method of assessing risk tends to be low. According to most research on predictive validity, unstructured clinical assessment is less accurate at predicting risk than other, more structured methods (though there have been some issues raised with the evidence supporting this claim). 
 Anamnestic assessment is another type, which is a form of clinical risk assessment that is focused on risk factors specific to the individual being examined. This type of risk assessment tends to be used for assessing violence risk, and relies heavily on an examinee's past history of violent behavior to identify risk factors for that individual behaving aggressively again, rather than risk factors for violence in general. Because these risk assessments are based on clinical interviews and tailored to the individual in question, they can be useful for determining ways to reduce an individual's violence risk, but they suffer from the same limitations as general unstructured clinical assessment in terms of interrater reliability.
 Structured professional judgement (SPJ) is similar to unstructured clinical assessment in that the examiner still makes the final decision about risk, but it is more structured because these tools give the examiner specific, empirically-based factors to focus on when assessing risk. Because of the more structured nature of these assessments, the interrater reliability of risk assessments done using these tools tends to be higher than that of those done using completely unstructured clinical assessment, and some argue the accuracy is higher than other types of assessment including actuarial methods, but there are questions about the legitimacy of these claims. Additionally, because most actuarial risk assessment tools are based on static (or unchanging) risk factors, SPJ tools tend to be better at identifying dynamic risk factors (which can be changed), and thus can be more useful in treatment settings than actuarial assessments. 
 Actuarial risk assessment is a more objective method of risk assessment that involves structured tools and algorithms that combine certain risk factors to produce a risk score or rating. The algorithm tells evaluators both which factors to pay attention to and how to weigh and combine them to produce the risk score. The risk factors included in actuarial tools are empirically linked to violence or recidivism risk and tend to be more static (permanent, unchanging) than dynamic (changeable). Because actuarial risk assessment tools provide the most guidance and involve the least amount of clinician judgment, they tend to have higher interrater reliability and to be more accurate than unstructured clinical assessment. However, these types of assessment are less flexible, and their mathematical and algorithmic nature might make testimony based on them more difficult for jurors and laypeople to understand. Two example actuarial tools for assessing violence risk are the Violence Risk Appraisal Guide (VRAG) and the Classification of Violence Risk (COVR). An example actuarial tool for assessing sexual recidivism risk is the Static-99 Revised (Static-99R).
 Adjusted actuarial risk assessment is a combination of unstructured clinical assessment and actuarial risk assessment. In adjusted actuarial assessment, evaluators use an actuarial method to determine risk, and then adjust the score produced by the algorithm based on their own clinical judgment. This type of risk assessment is meant to make actuarial instruments more flexible and adaptable to the facts of a specific case; however, supporters of the actuarial technique tend to criticize this method as forgoing the main benefit of actuarial risk assessment—the lack of subjectivity—by reintroducing clinician judgment after a risk assessment score has been calculated.

 Effectiveness of risk assessment. The evidence regarding the effectiveness of risk assessment (particularly established risk assessment tools) is mixed. According to a systematic literature review, professionals surveyed (including correctional staff, mental health professionals, and judges) have mixed opinions about the utility of risk assessment tools for risk management and treatment, and the evidence is also mixed regarding whether risk assessment tools are associated with reductions in violence and offending. Another systematic review and meta-analysis found some evidence that the use of risk assessment tools may reduce "restrictive placements," which could include pretrial detainment as well as post-conviction placements and potential release, but the effect was small and, after removing studies with a high possibility of bias do to confounding variables, not statistically significant. This same review also found that when these decreases in restrictive placements occurred, there was not a corresponding increase in recidivism; however, the evidence was low regarding the impact of risk assessment tools on recidivism generally and violent recidivism in particular. Moreover, a literature review found that even if risk assessment tools are effective, they may not be reaching their full potential to effect change because of implementation issues and issues applying risk assessment-derived recommendations to future risk management and treatment decisions.
 Controversy in risk assessment.  One issue that is particularly prevalent in discussions about risk assessment and the use of risk assessment in sentencing is its potential impact on racial disparities in criminal justice outcomes. Scholars and practitioners have argued that the use of risk assessment in sentencing may have no impact on racial disparities, increase racial disparities, and/or reduce racial disparities. Those who argue that risk assessment may have no impact on racial disparities tend to base their arguments on the assumption that sentencing decisions made by judicial intuition or sentencing guidelines based on prior criminal history are also prone to racial bias, so the alternatives to risk assessment in sentencing may not be much different with regard to racial disparities. Those who argue that risk assessment in sentencing reduces racial bias argue that, because race cannot constitutionally be included as a risk factor on any reputable measure of risk, the use of risk assessment tools decreases the weight people otherwise may give to racial factors in sentencing decisions. Those who argue that risk assessment in sentencing increases racial disparities, however, argue that because risk assessment tools (particularly actuarial tools) tend to be based on past criminal justice data, the use of these instruments to sentence future offenders may reproduce or even exacerbate existing racial disparities in criminal justice outcomes. Additionally, most legal scholars and laypeople are very opposed to the explicit use of race in risk assessment, but some argue that variables that are included in many risk assessment tools, including socioeconomic variables, employment, education, neighborhood quality, and criminal history, are so highly correlated with race that they serve as proxies for race in these instruments. Empirical research that has attempted to investigate the impact of using risk assessment tools on racial disparities has suffered from a lack of sufficient data. In a systematic review and meta-analysis that attempted to investigate the impact of different types of risk assessment on racial disparities in criminal justice outcomes, the authors were unable to find enough studies that actually measured this impact to draw clear conclusions, and other studies have also found limited or mixed effects of risk assessments on racially disparate outcomes.

Other types of evaluations 
While insanity and competency assessments are among the most common criminal assessments administered within the legal system, there are several other types implemented. Some of these include death penalty case assessments, assessments of child sexual abuse, assessments for child custody or divorce cases, civil court assessments, and immigration/asylum cases.

 Immigration/asylum evaluations. In removal proceedings, the judge or parties may request the assistance of a forensic psychologist for those individuals eligible to apply for various forms of immigration benefits. There are eight grounds for an individual to apply for which are hardship, risk for torture, asylum, domestic violence, ANAC (abused, neglected, or abandoned children), discretionary determinations, risk assessment, and competence to proceed. Each removal proceeding is as unique as the individual on trial which is where mental health professionals play a crucial role in helping document their experiences as many individuals may or may not have proof to support their stories. In the case that an individual does apply for relief/protection from removal, a psychological evaluation is conducted by a forensic psychologist to help the court determine if the individual meets the requirements for the type of relief for which they are applying. Immigration evaluations are often done through a series of interviews with the individual and their family members that delve into their life of what led up to the migration, medical information such as history and physical examinations, social background information, and their current level of cognitive and psychological functioning.

Distinction between forensic and therapeutic evaluation
A forensic psychologist's interactions with and ethical responsibilities to the client differ widely from those of a psychologist dealing with a client in a clinical setting.
 Scope. Rather than the broad set of issues a psychologist addresses in a clinical setting, a forensic psychologist addresses a narrowly defined set of events or interactions of a nonclinical nature.
 Importance of client's perspective. A clinician places primary importance on understanding the client's unique point of view, while a forensic psychologist is interested in accuracy, and the client's viewpoint is secondary.
 Voluntariness. Usually, in a clinical setting, a psychologist is dealing with a voluntary client. A forensic psychologist evaluates clients by order of a judge or at the behest of an attorney.
 Autonomy. Voluntary clients have more latitude and autonomy regarding the assessment's objectives. Any assessment usually takes their concerns into account. The objectives of a forensic examination are confined by the applicable statutes or common law elements that pertain to the legal issue in question.
 Threats to validity. While the client and therapist are working toward a common goal, although unconscious distortion may occur, in the forensic context there is a substantially greater likelihood of intentional and conscious distortion.
 Relationship and dynamics. While therapeutic interactions work toward developing a trusting, empathic therapeutic alliance, a forensic psychologist may not ethically nurture the client or act in a "helping" role, as the forensic evaluator has divided loyalties and there are substantial limits on confidentiality they can guarantee the client. A forensic evaluator must always be aware of manipulation in the adversary context of a legal setting. These concerns mandate an emotional distance that is unlike a therapeutic interaction.
 Pace and setting. Unlike therapeutic interactions which may be guided by many factors, the forensic setting with its court schedules, limited resources, and other external factors places great time constraints on the evaluation without opportunities for reevaluation. The forensic examiner focuses on the importance of accuracy and the finality of legal dispositions.

Ethics in forensic psychology 

The ethical recommendations and expectations outlined for forensic psychology specifically are listed in the APA's Specialty Guidelines for Forensic Psychology. These guidelines involve reminders that forensic psychologists should value integrity, impartiality, and fairness, as well as avoid conflicts of interest when possible. These conflicts of interest may arise in situations in which the psychologist is working as a consultant to one side or another in a court case, when the psychologist is required to testify or evaluate something that collides with their own beliefs or values, or when a psychologist is faced with the decision of choosing between playing the role of an individual's evaluator or treatment provider in a case. This final conflict of interest also relates to the ethical guidelines relating to having multiple relationships with clients. As a standard of ethics, forensic psychologists are expected to offer a certain amount of reduced fee or pro bono services for individuals who may not be able to afford hiring a psychologist for a court case otherwise. Other ethical guidelines involve receiving informed consent from clients before communicating information regarding their treatment or evaluations, respecting and acknowledging privacy, confidentiality, and privilege among clients, remaining impartial and objective when involved in a trial, and weighing the moral and ethical costs of complying with any court orders that may conflict with professional standards.

Salary of a forensic psychologist 
There is a wide range of pay for individuals in the forensic psychology field. In the United States, the median annual income of clinical-forensic psychologists is $125,000 - $149,999, and the pay can range from $50,000 (entry-level) a year to more than $350,000 a year. There are also pay differences for men and women, where female forensic psychologists earn $0.83 for every $1.00 earned by male psychologists. Forensic psychologists' income varies from one state to another.

Notable research in forensic psychology

See also
 Applied psychology
 Forensic psychiatry
 Settled insanity
 Competency evaluation (law)
 List of United States Supreme Court cases involving mental health
 Media psychology
 Medical jurisprudence

Notes

References

Further reading
 Adler, J. R. (Ed.). (2004). Forensic Psychology: Concepts, debates and practice. Cullompton: Willan.
 Bartol, C. R., & Bartol, A. M. (1999). History of Forensic Psychology. In A. K. Hess & Irving B. Weiner (Eds.), Handbook of Forensic Psychology (2nd ed.). London: John Wiley and Sons.
 
 Dalby, J. T.  (1997) Applications of Psychology in the Law Practice: A guide to relevant issues, practices and theories. Chicago: American Bar Association. 
 Davis, J. A. (2001). Stalking crimes and victim protection. CRC Press. 538 pages. . (hbk.)
 
 
 G.H. Gudjonsson and Lionel Haward: Forensic Psychology. A guide to practice. (1998)  (pbk.),  (hbk.)
 
 Melton, G. B., Petrila, J., Poythress, N. G., Otto, R. K., Mossman, D., & Condie, L. O. (2017). Psychological evaluations for the courts: A handbook for mental health professionals and lawyers (4th ed.). New York, NY: Guilford. 
 
 Ogloff, J. R. P., & Finkelman, D. (1999). Psychology and Law: An Overview. In R. Roesch, S. D. Hart, & J. R. P. Ogloff (Eds.), Psychology and Law the State of the Discipline . New York: Springer. 
 O'Mahony, B. (2013). So, You Want to Be a Forensic Psychologist? Create Space. 
 Ribner, N.G.(2002). California School of Professional Psychology Handbook of Juvenile Forensic Psychology. Jossey-Bass. 
 Roesch, R., & Zapf, P. A. (Eds.). (2012). Forensic assessments in criminal and civil law: A handbook for lawyers. NY: Oxford University Press. 
 Rogers, R. (Ed.) (2008). Clinical assessment of malingering and deception (3rd ed.). New York, NY: Guilford.

External links
 American Academy of Forensic Psychology Board-certified forensic experts, continuing education.
 American Board of Forensic Psychology Board certification and other information.
 American Psychology - Law Society
 Australian and New Zealand Association of Psychiatry, Psychology and Law
 European Association of Psychology and Law
 European Association of Psychology and Law Student Society Resources and Fact sheets on Forensic Psychology

 
Academic disciplines